The Henry Stommel Research Award is awarded by the American Meteorological Society to researchers in recognition of outstanding contributions to the advancement of the understanding of the dynamics and physics of the ocean. The award is in the form of a medallion and was named for Henry Stommel.

Recipients

See also

 List of oceanography awards

References

Notes
A. The information in the table is according to the "Past winners" web page at the official website of the American Meteorological Society, unless otherwise specified by additional citations. (Enter award name only and click
submit)

External links 
AMS Awards and Nominations

American science and technology awards
Meteorology awards
American Meteorological Society
Oceanography awards